Civil-military operations or CMO are activities of a military force to minimize civil interference on and maximize civil support for military operations.  CMO is conducted in conjunction with combat operations during wartime and becomes a central part of a military campaign in counter-insurgencies.  Some militaries have specialized units dedicated to conduct CMO, such as civil affairs forces or form task forces specifically for this purposes, such as a joint civil-military operations task force in the U.S. Military.  Also, some militaries have staff sections dedicated to planning and coordinating CMO for their command.  CMO is often called civil-military co-operation or CIMIC in NATO operations and civil-military co-ordination in UN operations.

Official definitions
The Canadian Military defines CMO as:

The U.S. Military defines CMO as:

Notes

Civil affairs
Military science
Military operations by type